The Panare, who call themselves E'ñepá, are an indigenous people group who live in the Amazonian region of Venezuela. Their heartland is located in the Cedeño Municipality, Bolívar State, while a smaller community lives in Northern Amazonas State. They speak the Panare language, which belongs to the Carib family.

While Western culture has had a moderate influence on other tribes of the region, the Panare retain much of their culture and tradition, resembling that of the North American natives in the late 1800s and the early 1900s.

The first ever episode of the long-running ITV anthropological television series Disappearing World, in 1970 focused on these people.

See also
Panare language

References

Indigenous peoples in Venezuela
Venezuela